In e-commerce, the conversion funnel is the journey a consumer takes through an Internet advertising or search system, navigating an e-commerce website, and finally making a purchase. The consumer is seen as being "converted" from a visitor to the site to a buyer.

A funnel describes the progressive reduction in the number of users at each stage of the process. Advertising efforts can be aimed at "upper funnel", "middle funnel", or "lower funnel" potential customers.

Typically a large number of customers search for a product/service or register as page view on a referring page which is linked to the e-commerce site by a banner ad, ad network or conventional link. Only a small proportion of those seeing the advertisement or link actually click the link. The metric used to describe this ratio is the click-through rate (CTR) and represents the top level of the funnel. Typical banner and advertising click-through rates are 0.02% in late 2010 and have decreased over the past three years. Click-through rates are highly sensitive to small changes such as link text, link size, link position and many others and these effects interact cumulatively. The process of understanding which creative material brings the highest click-through rate is known as ad optimization.

Once the link is clicked and the visitor to the referring page enters the e-commerce site itself, only a small proportion of visitors typically proceed to the product pages, creating further constriction of the metaphorical funnel. Each step the visitor takes further reduces the number of visitors, typically by 30%–80% per page.

Adding the product to the shopping cart, registering or filling in contact details and payment all further reduce the numbers step-by-step cumulatively along the funnel. The more steps, the fewer visitors get through to becoming paying customers. For this reason, sites with similar pricing and products can have hugely different conversion rates of visitors to customers and therefore greatly differing profits.

See also
 Purchase funnel

References

Web analytics